The Melbourne Bowling Club, nicknamed the Demons, and affiliated with Bowls Victoria (BV), is the oldest lawn bowling club in Australia.  Founded in 1864, the club has been based at Union Street, Windsor, Victoria, Australia on a continuous basis since formation.

Melbourne's uniform consists of a shirt displaying a Red and white devil, on a blue background, and blue pants/shorts with "Melbourne" prominently displayed along their length.

Historically the club has had many successes going back to 1892, and since the formation of the Premier League in 1997 Melbourne has won eight premierships having played in 17 grand finals in 21 years.

The club also currently fields a team in Divisions 2, 4 and 8 in the Bowls Victoria Saturday Metropolitan Pennant competitions.

History

Early years

On 11 March 1864  The Melbourne Bowling Club was founded by John Campbell, obtaining a lease of land at “Chapel” Street (facing Union Street), as recorded as the first entry in the records of the club in the handwriting of John Campbell. The club has continuously occupied this same parcel of land ever since.  This record makes Melbourne Bowling Club the oldest bowling club in Australia.  By October that year, the bowls greens were in full operation, as was a temporary structure for entertaining, as well as facilities for quoits and croquet.

In 1865 a breakaway group formed the Prahran Bowling club, and this remained so until the 1980s, when Prahran’s greens were closed and the members rejoined Melbourne.

In 1867, the painter S. T. Gill visited the Melbourne Bowling Club and painted two water-colours of a bowls match in progress, one of the summer green and one of the winter green. The paintings were purchased by members, and were presented to the club as a gift in 1892.

In 1887, the original Georgian style double story brick clubhouse was opened, which still stands today.  The original building had upper and lower verandas with ornate iron-lace work, which were removed during renovations over the intervening years.  Gas lighting was added in later years.

In addition to bowls, the club catered for a wide variety of activities during this period, including skittles and tennis.  Remnants of the skittles alley were rediscovered in the foundations during renovations in the 1900s.

During this time also saw the formation of the Victorian Bowling Association (1880), and the number of inter-club competitions grew, with the first premiership “pennant” trophy being awarded to Melbourne in 1892

In 1899, Melbourne Bowling Club player, Major B.J. Wardill, in England to watch the Australian Cricket team under the captaincy of Joe Darling, met with him and English bowler Mr S.E. Yelland.  As a result of the meeting, Major Wardill arranged for the Victorian and NSW Association Presidents, also travelling to England, to meet with Mr Yelland, resulting in the formation of the Imperial Bowling Association, becoming the International Bowling Board, now World Bowls Ltd, the governing body for bowls worldwide.

1900–1950s
The early 1900s was a successful period for Melbourne Bowling club on the field when it won many championships as a team, as well as numerous members winning state and Australian titles.
In the 1920s the club saw a number of extensions built, including a long single storey building added to the side in 1923, and which is still in use today. 
The club was very fortunate to have a number of patrons, who supported the club in many ways, including R.G. Watson, who left a legacy to the club in the form of the R.G. Watson Trust, and R.G. Watson Trophy tournament, which still runs today to honour his name and contribution.

1950s–1990s
The 1950s also saw a great deal of on-field success, and the club extended its Windsor site by acquiring surrounding properties with the view to future extensions.

The club throughout the 1900s was a hub of social activity as well, with large member gatherings for social as well as bowls based functions.  In particular the Thursday member night formal dinners were high sought after events to attend.  These events were regularly reported in The Argus, The Malvern Standard and Malvern Times, excerpts of which can be found on the club website today(ref).

1990s–present

Neighbouring houses were incorporated into the clubhouse to provide a gaming room, which has now been converted into a meeting room “The Demons Den”.
In 1997, Bowls Victoria (formerly the Royal Victorian Bowls Association) formed the Premier League pennant competition, to represent the highest level of competition in metropolitan Melbourne.  Melbourne Bowling Club has been represented in Premier league every year since inception, and to date has appeared in the final x times, winning x times, also capturing 3 State Pennant titles as well.  The current player group include a number of region, state and Australian representatives, and the honour boards are testament to success at region, state, national and international levels.
In 2014, the club celebrates its 150th anniversary.

Club symbols and identity

Uniform
 
One of the early adopters of coloured uniforms, Melbourne distinctive Blue, Red, and White Uniform features a stylised “M” on the front of the shirt, together with a cartoon style Devil.

Song
The club song is sung to the tune of “You’re a Grand Old Flag”, George Cohen, 1906

It’s a grand old flag
It’s a high flying flag
It’s the emblem for me and for you
It’s the emblem of the team we love
The team of the Red and the Blue
Ev’ry heart beats true
For the Red and the Blue
And we sing this song to you (What do we sing!)
Should old acquaintance be forgot
Keep your eye on the Red and the Blue

Committees

Club Committee

Match Committee

Membership

Size
Club membership in 2021 is approximately 250, and the club fields teams in 4 competitions in the Bowls Victoria Saturday Pennant Competition, 1 team in the Bowls Victoria Midweek Pennant Competition as well as a team in the Southern District Electric Light Bowls Association.

Demographics
The club attracts a broad range of members across the metropolitan region.  Largely due to the ongoing success of the Premier League side, close to 60% of the membership comes from outside the local Stonnington Council area.

Club Honours

Premierships
Victorian Bowling Association/RVBA
1892, 1896 (Prahran), 1899 (Prahran), 1925, 1927, 1929,1957,1959,1960,
Bowls Victoria Premier League 
Premiers 2000, 2003, 2004, 2008, 2012, 2017, 2021, 2022
Runners Up 1997, 1998, 2001, 2002, 2006, 2007, 2010, 2013, 2016, 2018
Champions of State Pennant
1997, 2003, 2012, 2017, 2021
Other Division Pennants
A Reserve 1969, 1972
B/B1 Pennant 1935, 1939, 1951, 1969, 1970, 1971
B5 Pennant 1956
Division 2 Pennant 2015
Division 4 Pennant 1990, 2000
Division 9 Pennant 2000

Individual honours

Australian representatives
1998–99 – P.D. Arthur (O60s)
2004–05 – R. Green Jnr
2005–06 – B. Lester
2006–07 – B. McCallum (U25s)
2011–12 – D. Fisher
2015–16 – Curtis Hanley (U18s)

Commonwealth Games
2004 – Bronze Medal - B Lester (Pairs)

World Championships
1976 – South Africa R. Middleton Singles Silver Medal, Pairs Bronze Medal

Victorian Representatives
Dennis Arthur
Ben Fearn (U18)
Russell Green Jnr
Grant Hopwood
Brett Leighton
John McCarron
Craig McCarron
Tayla Morison (U18)
Scott Mortimer
Arnold O'Brien
Brian Richards
Todd Simmons
Michael Vesikko
Curtis Hanley
Bryce Young
Shane Fordham
Matt Ellul

Australian Titles
Australian Singles
1898 - G. W. Sims
1902 – G. W. Sims
1903 – E. M. Pascoe
1994 – G. Bridge
Australian Champion of Champion Singles
2012 – D. Fisher
Australian Pairs 
2013 – R. Green (Jnr) and D. Fisher

Victorian Titles
State Singles
1882 – E. J. Lewis
1893 – C. Wood
1897 – G. W. Sims
1930 – W. Trumble
1975 – R. Middleton (Prahran)
2001 - G. Cridge
2006 - B. Lester
2008 - R. Green Jnr
Champion of Champions Singles
1901 – S. Fry (Prahran)
1903 – A. Wartman
1908 – J. Doig (Prahran)
1909 – E.M. Pascoe
1911 – E.M. Pascoe
1915 – E.M. Pascoe
1916 – E.M. Pascoe
1917 – E.M. Pascoe
1918 – E.M. Pascoe
1921 – E.M. Pascoe
1927 – W. Trumble
1968 – R. Middleton (Prahran)
2001 – G. Maskell
2007 – R. Green Jnr
2012 - D. Fisher
State Pairs
1922 – J. E. White, T. M. Vains
1928 – C. Johnson, W. C. Dempster
1995 – B.J. Richards, B. Hoey
1996 – E. B. Close (Mixed)
1999 – E.B. Close, G.J. Hopwood
State Fours
1953 – D. McClymont, A. Fehring, B. Tully, L. Phillips
1966 – M. Connellan, H, R, Ashworth, G. Davies, L. Lehman
1974 – B.K. Samuel, M.J. Donnellan, G. Davies, G. De C. Bosisto
2008 – S Jeffery, P Williamson, J McCarron, R. Green Jnr
State U35 Singles
2003 – R. Green Jnr
State U18/19 Singles
1999 – R. Green Jnr
State U18/19 Triples
1999 – R. Green Jnr
2003 – J. McCarron

Life Members
J Blyth*
R J Cowie*
D McDougall*
G Lewis*
S Elliott*
W Small*
S B Hunt*
E J Lewis*
T F Morkham*
G Thompson*
H A A Embling*
G W Sims*
C Andrews*
H J Westbrook*
W Thomson*
F C Jeffery*
J L Doeg*
A J Conquest*
H J Petrie*
H A Lay*
L R McIlroy*
A H Orchard*
W E Trumble*
W H McPherson*
W H Stock*
F Bacash*
W M Ward*
R G Watson*
A E Wallis*
H R Ashworth*
E K O'Donnell*
J W Morris*
N W Woody*
H D Chandler*
A D Kearton JP*
G J Hewett*
E Folks*
C R Morrell*
R F Cross*
C W Sinclair*
J G (Ted) Took*
Colin W. Gorman
Peter Curwen-Walker
Barry McGregor

(*Deceased)

In popular culture

Crackerjack
Melbourne Bowling Club was the major location site for the Australian movie Crackerjack, one of Australia’s highest grossing feature films.

See also
World Bowls Events
Bowls Australia
Bowls Victoria

Footnotes

External links
 Official website of the Melbourne Bowling Club

Sports clubs established in 1864
Bowls in Australia
1864 establishments in Australia
Bowls clubs
Sporting clubs in Melbourne
Sport in the City of Stonnington